Three Tough Guys (also known as Tough Guys) is a 1974 crime-action film directed by Duccio Tessari. It stars Lino Ventura, Fred Williamson and Isaac Hayes, who also composed the soundtrack. It is a coproduction between United States, Italy (where it was released Uomini duri) and France (where is known as Les Durs). The film was shot in Chicago.

Plot
Roman Catholic priest Father Charlie and former police officer Lee solve a bank robbery mystery that stretches across the city. After Lee is removed from the force due to $1,000,000 being stolen from the bank, Father Charlie helps him to gain revenge for the loss of one of his friends.

Cast
 Lino Ventura as Father Charlie
 Isaac Hayes as Lee
 Fred Williamson as Joe "Snake"
 Paula Kelly as Fay
 William Berger as Captain Ryan 
 Vittorio Sanipoli as Mike Petralia
 Lorella De Luca as Anne Lombardo
 Mario Erpichini as Gene Lombardo
 Jess Hahn as The Bartender 
 Jacques Herlin as Mike Petralia
 Guido Leontini as Sergeant Sam 
 Luciano Salce as The Bishop
 Nazzareno Zamperla as Snake's Henchman

Production
Three Tough Guys was filmed in Rome and on location in Chicago between September 4 and October 1973. The film was Isaac Hayes' acting debut.

Release
Three Tough Guys opened in New York on March 15, 1974. was released in France under the title Les durs on May 29, 1974. It was released in Italy under the title Uomini duri where it was distributed by Titanus. It grossed a total of 761.271 million Italian lire. Italian film historian and critic Roberto Curti said this gross was "moderate, but not outstanding success" as it had grossed less than half of Enzo G. Castellari's Street Law.

Soundtrack

The soundtrack was composed, conducted and performed by Isaac Hayes, with string arrangements performed by the Memphis Symphony Orchestra and rhythm tracks performed by Isaac Hayes' band, The Movement.  The original LP record, Tough Guys, was released by Enterprise Records, an imprint of Stax Records.

The main theme of Three Tough Guys would be used in Quentin Tarantino's Kill Bill Vol. 2. "Hung Up on My Baby" was sampled for the Geto Boys song "Mind Playing Tricks on Me."

Original track listing
Side one
 "Title Theme" - 2:32 	
 "Randolph & Dearborn" - 4:24 	
 "The Red Rooster" - 4:04 	
 "Joe Bell" - 4:57 	

Side two
 "Hung Up On My Baby" - 6:15 	
 "Kidnapped" - 2:40 	
 "Run Fay Run" - 2:45 	
 "Buns O' Plenty" - 4:37 	
 "The End Theme" - 1:13

Notes

References

External links

1974 films
1970s buddy films
1970s crime action films
Blaxploitation films
Films about Catholic priests
Films directed by Duccio Tessari
Films produced by Dino De Laurentiis
Films set in Chicago
Films with screenplays by Luciano Vincenzoni
Italian crime action films
Italian buddy films
English-language French films
English-language Italian films
Isaac Hayes soundtracks
Albums produced by Isaac Hayes
Stax Records albums
Films scored by Isaac Hayes
French crime action films
French buddy films
Titanus films
1970s Italian films
1970s French films